This is a list of mammals of Arizona. It includes species native to the U.S. state of Arizona and mammals accidentally introduced into the state. However, it does not include domesticated animals that become feral and cause major disruptions to various ecosystems.

Opossums 
Family: Didelphidae
 Virginia opossum, Didelphis virginiana

Shrews 
Family: Soricidae
 North American least shrew, Cryptotis parva
 Crawford's gray shrew, Notiosorex crawfordi
 Arizona shrew, Sorex arizonae
 Cinereus shrew, Sorex cinereus
 Merriam's shrew, Sorex merriami
 Montane shrew, Sorex monticolus
 American water shrew, Sorex palustris

Bats 
Family: Molossidae
 Western mastiff bat, Eumops perotis
 Pocketed free-tailed bat, Nyctinomops femorosaccus 
 Big free-tailed bat, Nyctinomops macrotis 
 Mexican free-tailed bat, Tadarida brasiliensis
Family: Phyllostomidae
 Mexican long-tongued bat, Choeronycteris mexicana 
 Greater long-nosed bat, Leptonycteris nivalis
 Lesser long-nosed bat, Leptonycteris yerbabuenae

Family: Vespertilionidae
 Hoary bat, Aeorestes cinereus
 Pallid bat, Antrozous pallidus 
 Townsend's big-eared bat, Corynorhinus townsendii 
 Big brown bat, Eptesicus fuscus
 Spotted bat, Euderma maculatum 
 Allen's big-eared bat, Idionycteris phyllotis
 Silver-haired bat, Lasionycteris noctivagans
 Western red bat, Lasiurus blossevillii
 Western yellow bat, Lasiurus xanthinus
 Southwestern myotis, Myotis auriculus
 California myotis, Myotis californicus
 Western small-footed myotis, Myotis ciliolabrum
 Long-eared myotis, Myotis evotis
 Little brown bat, Myotis lucifugus
 Arizona myotis, Myotis occultus
 Fringed myotis, Myotis thysanodes
 Yuma myotis, Myotis yumanensis
 Western pipistrelle, Pipistrellus hersperus

Lagomorphs 
Family: Leporidae
 Antelope jackrabbit, Lepus alleni
 Black-tailed jackrabbit, Lepus californicus 
 White-sided jackrabbit, Lepus callotis presence uncertain
 Desert cottontail, Sylvilagus audubonii 
 Eastern cottontail, Sylvilagus floridanus
 Robust cottontail, Sylvilagus holzneri
S. h. hesperius
 Mountain cottontail, Sylvilagus nuttallii

Rodents 
Family: Castoridae
 American beaver, Castor canadensis 

Family: Geomyidae
 Yellow-faced pocket gopher, Cratogeomys castanops
 Desert pocket gopher, Geomys arenarius
 Plains pocket gopher, Geomys bursarius
 Botta's pocket gopher, Thomomys bottae
 Northern pocket gopher, Thomomys talpoides
 Southern pocket gopher, Thomomys umbrinus

Family: Heteromyidae
 Bailey's pocket mouse, Chaetodipus balieyi
 Hispid pocket mouse, Chaetodipus hispidus
 Rock pocket mouse, Chaetodipus intermedius
 Desert pocket mouse, Chaetodipus penicillatus
 Spiny pocket mouse, Chaetodipus spinatus
 Merriam's kangaroo rat, Dipodomys merriamii
 Ord's kangaroo rat, Dipodomys ordii
 Banner-tailed kangaroo rat, Dipodomys spectabilis
 Arizona pocket mouse, Perognathus amplus
 Silky pocket mouse, Perognathus flavus
 Little pocket mouse, Perognathus longirostris
 Merriam's pocket mouse, Perognathus merriami
 Great Basin pocket mouse, Perognathus parvus

Family: Cricetidae
 Northern pygmy mouse, Baiomys taylori
 Long-tailed vole, Microtus longicadus
 Mogollon vole, Microtus mogollonenis
 Montane vole, Microtus montanus
 Southern red-backed vole, Myodes gapperi
 White-throated woodrat, Neotoma albigula
 Bushy-tailed woodrat, Neotoma cinerea
 Arizona woodrat, Neotoma devia
 Desert woodrat, Neotoma lepida
 White-toothed woodrat, Neotoma leucodon
 Mexican woodrat, Neotoma mexicana
 Stephen's woodrat, Neotoma stephensi
 Common muskrat, Ondatra zibethicus
 Northern grasshopper mouse, Onychomys leucogaster
 Southern grasshopper mouse, Onychomys torridus
 Brush deermouse, Peromyscus boylii
 Canyon deermouse, Peromyscus crinitus
 Cactus deermouse, Peromyscus eremicus
Gambel's deermouse, Peromyscus gambelii
Southern deermouse, Peromyscus labecula
 White-footed mouse, Peromyscus leucopus
Black-eared mouse, Peromyscus melanotis
 Northern rock mouse, Peromyscus nasutus
Western deer mouse, Peromyscus sonoriensis
 Pinyon mouse, Peromyscus truei
 Fulvous harvest mouse, Reithrodontomys fulvescens
 Western harvest mouse, Reithrodontomys megalotis
 Arizona cotton rat, Sigmodon arizonae
 Tawny-bellied cotton rat, Sigmodon fulviventer
 Hispid cotton rat, Sigmodon hispidus
 Yellow-nosed cotton rat, Sigmodon ochrognathus

Family: Muridae
 House mouse, Mus musculus introduced
 Norway rat, Rattus norvegicus introduced
 Black rat, Rattus rattus introduced

Family: Dipodidae
 Western jumping mouse, Zapus princeps

Family: Erethizontidae
 North American porcupine, Erethizon dorsatum

Family: Echimyidae
 Coypu, Myocastor coypus introduced

Family: Sciuridae
 Harris's antelope squirrel, Ammospermophilus harrisii
 White-tailed antelope squirrel, Ammospermophilus leucurus
 Gunnison's prairie dog, Cynomys gunnisoni
 Black-tailed prairie dog, Cynomys ludovicianus
 Yellow-bellied marmot, Marmota flaviventris
 Gray-footed chipmunk, Neotamias canipes
 Gray-collared chipmunk, Neotamias cinereicollis
 Cliff chipmunk, Neotamias dorsalis
 Least chipmunk, Neotamias minimus
 Colorado chipmunk, Neotamias quadrivittatus
 Hopi chipmunk, Neotamias rufus
 Uinta chipmunk, Neotamias umbrinus
 Rock squirrel, Otospermophilus variegatus
 Abert's squirrel, Sciurus aberti
 Arizona gray squirrel, Sciurus arizonensis
 Mexican fox squirrel, Sciurus nayaritensis
 Fox squirrel, Sciurus niger
 Golden-mantled ground squirrel, Spermophilus lateralis
 Mexican ground squirrel, Spermophilus mexicanus 
 Thirteen-lined ground squirrel, Spermophilus tridecimlineatus
 Southwestern red squirrel, Tamiasciurus fremonti
Mount Graham red squirrel, T. f. grahamensis
 Spotted ground squirrel, Xerospermophilus spilosoma
 Round-tailed ground squirrel, Xerospermophilus tereticaudus

Carnivorans
Family: Canidae
 Coyote, Canis latrans
 Gray wolf, Canis lupus reintroduced
 Mexican wolf, C. l. baileyi reintroduced
Mogollon mountain wolf, C. l. mogollonensis extinct
Southern Rocky Mountain wolf, C. l. youngi extinct
 Gray fox, Urocyon cinereoargenteus 
 Kit fox, Vulpes macrotis
 Red fox, Vulpes vulpes 

Family: Ursidae
 American black bear, Ursus americanus 
 Brown bear, Ursus arctos extirpated
Grizzly bear, U. a. horribilis extirpated
Mexican grizzly bear, U. a. horribilis extinct

Family: Procyonidae
 Ring-tailed cat, Bassariscus astutus
 White-nosed coati, Nasua narica
 Raccoon, Procyon lotor 

Family: Mephitidae
 American hog-nosed skunk, Conepatus leuconotus
 Hooded skunk, Mephitis macroura
 Striped skunk, Mephitis mephitis 
 Western spotted skunk, Spilogale gracilis 

Family: Felidae
 Ocelot, Leopardus pardalis
 Bobcat, Lynx rufus 
 Jaguar, Panthera onca vagrant
 Cougar, Puma concolor

Family: Mustelidae
 North American river otter, Lontra canadensis
 Black-footed ferret, Mustela nigripes reintroduced
 Long-tailed weasel, Neogale frenata
 American badger, Taxidea taxus

Even-toed ungulates
Family: Antilocapridae
 Pronghorn, Antilocapra americana 
Sonoran pronghorn, A. a. sonoriensis 

Family: Bovidae
 American bison, Bison bison reintroduced
Plains bison, B. b. bison reintroduced
 Bighorn sheep, Ovis canadensis 
Desert bighorn sheep, O. c. nelsoni 

Family: Cervidae
 Elk, Cervus canadensis reintroduced
†Merriam's elk, C. c. merriami extinct
Rocky Mountain elk, C. c. nelsoni introduced
 Mule deer, Odocoileus hemionus
Desert mule deer, O. h. eremicus
 White-tailed deer, Odocoileus virginianius
Coues' deer, O. v. couesi

Family: Tayassuidae
 Collared peccary, Dicotyles tajacu

References

Mammals
Arizona